Giulio Zeppieri was the defending champion but lost in the first round to Matteo Arnaldi.

Nuno Borges won the title after defeating Miljan Zekić 6–3, 7–5 in the final.

Seeds

Draw

Finals

Top half

Bottom half

References

External links
Main draw
Qualifying draw

Open Città della Disfida - 1
2022 Singles